The Justice Ball is an annual fundraiser for the Los Angeles based charity, Bet Tzedek Legal Services - The House of Justice. All net proceeds from the event directly benefit Bet Tzedek.

Since its inception in 1996, The Justice Ball has become a fundraiser that supports the causes of legal aid and social justice while bringing young professionals together for a phenomenal evening of music, dance, and great networking. Over the last 13 years, the event has raised over $4 million of the organization’s annual operating budget.

The 14th Annual Justice Ball was on June 26, 2010 at the Hollywood Palladium. The event featured a live mashup by headliners, Dave Navarro and DJ Skribble.

History
Timeline of past Justice Ball performers:
2015: Travie McCoy
2014: Taryn Manning
2013: Masquerade ball for everyone
2012: Jermaine Dupri
2011: Nelly
2010: Dave Navarro and DJ Skribble
2009: DJ AM
2008: The Psychedelic Furs
2007: Violent Femmes
2006: The Go-Go's
2005: Ozomatli
2004: Sugar Ray, Stephan Jenkins of Third Eye Blind
2003: Macy Gray
2002: Jason Bentley, Elan, Smitten
2001: The B-52's
2000: Billy Idol
1999: Berlin
1998: The M-80's and Boogie Knights
1997: The M-80's and Boogie Knights

News Articles
Flashback with the Violent Femmes-The Jewish Journal
California Lawyer
Los Angeles Daily Journal
Hollywood Reporter
The Daily News
Backstage
The Jewish Journal

References

External links
The Justice Ball Official Site
Bet Tzedek Legal Services - The House of Justice

Charity events in the United States